Max Møller (born 10 June 1943) is a Danish footballer. He played in six matches for the Denmark national football team from 1964 to 1965.

References

External links
 

1943 births
Living people
Danish men's footballers
Denmark international footballers
Place of birth missing (living people)
Association footballers not categorized by position